The MV Kooleen was a ferry operated by the Sydney Harbour Transport Board and its successors on Sydney Harbour.

History
When the Sydney Harbour Transport Board took over the Sydney Ferries Limited business in July 1951, it inherited an old fleet in need of replacement. In 1954, an order was placed with the State Dockyard for a prototype new type of ferry. Delivered in 1956, the Kooleen was fully enclosed single-deck ferry with a high all-round view bridge. This was not popular with her passengers, who were used to double deck ferries with outdoor areas and thus no more were ordered. It would not be until the 1968 arrival of the Lady Cutler that renewal of the fleet would commence.

The Kooleen remained in service until it was withdrawn in May 1985. In 1986 it was sold and converted to a houseboat. After sinking several times, it was sold in 2003 with the proposal of it being sunk as a dive vessel. However this was not to eventuate, and after sinking again in Berrys Bay it was broken up on site in July 2006.

See also
 List of Sydney Harbour ferries
 Timeline of Sydney Harbour ferries

References

External links

Ferries of New South Wales
Ferry transport in Sydney
Ships built in New South Wales
1956 ships